S. S. Stanley is an Indian film director and actor, who has directed Tamil films. He was active primarily as a filmmaker and a writer in the 2000s collaborating in ventures which often included Srikanth.

Career
S. S. Stanley apprenticed with directors Mahendran and Sasi before his directorial debut. After working as an assistant director for twelve years, he made his first film April Maadhathil, a college love story starring Srikanth and Sneha, which became a box office success. His second venture, Pudhukottaiyilirundhu Saravanan featuring Dhanush, became an average grosser with Stanley suggesting the film's story was misunderstood by audiences. He then began work on a film featuring Ravi Krishna, Anjali Devi's granddaughter Saila Rao and Sonia Agarwal for producer Krishnakanth, but financial troubles meant that the film was stalled and Stanley took a sabbatical.

Stanley then worked again with Srikanth in his next two ventures, with the romantic drama Mercury Pookkal releasing first.
His most recent directorial venture Kizhakku Kadalkarai Salai (2006) opened to poor reviews, with a critic noting it was "pathetic" and a "virtually invisible script". Stanley then began to appear in films as an actor, notably playing C. N. Annadurai in the biographical film Periyar (2007).

In early 2015, he planned to make a film titled Adam's Apple for AR Murugadoss's production house and cast Vaibhav and Andrea Jeremiah. However the project eventually did not materialise.

Filmography

As actor
Periyar (2007) 
Raavanan (2010) 
Ninaithathu Yaaro (2014) 
Andavan Kattalai (2016)
Kadugu (2016)
Aan Devathai (2018)
6 Athiyayam (2018)
Sarkar (2018)
Meendum (2021)
Bommai Nayagi (2023)

References

External links

Living people
Tamil film directors
Film directors from Kerala
21st-century Indian film directors
Screenwriters from Kerala
Male actors from Kerala
Male actors in Tamil cinema
People from Idukki district
Munnar
1965 births